Dickeyville may refer to a place in the United States:

Dickeyville, Indiana, an  unincorporated community
Dickeyville, Wisconsin, a village in Wisconsin
Dickeyville Grotto, a shrine and grotto in Wisconsin
Dickeyville Historic District, a historic district in Baltimore, Maryland